Louis Artus (10 January 1870 - 11 May 1960)  was a French writer.

A dramatist, playwright, novelist and critic, Artus began his career with parts in verse such as La Duchesse Putiphar. After studying with the Jesuits (in France and England), Artus, who regularly attended literary circles, collaborated with various newspapers like Le Gaulois, Excelsior, L'Intransigeant, Le Petit Journal, etc. He revealed himself as deeply Christian, attracted by the mysticism of the Middle Ages, and wrote several novels of Catholic inspiration.

Artus died in Paris at age 90.

He has authored several boulevard plays :
 1905: Cœur de moineau
 1907: L'Amour en banque
 1907: L'Ingénu libertin
 1910: Le Petit Dieu
 1929: Un homme d'hier

He has also written novels, particularly his famous trilogy :
 1918: La Maison du fou (chronique de Saint-Léonard), éd. Emile-Paul frères
 1920: La Maison du sage (histoire d'un crime), éd. Emile-Paul frères
 1922:Le Vin de ta vigne (nouvelle chronique de Saint-Léonard), éd. Emile-Paul frères
and
 1926: La chercheuse d'amour, éd. Bernard Grasset
 1928: Les chiens de Dieu, éd. Bernard Grasset
 1930: Au soir de Port-Royal, éd. Bernard Grasset
 1932: Paix sur la terre ?, éd. Bernard Grasset
 1939: L'hérésie du bonheur, éd. Plon
 1945: La plus belle histoire d'amour du monde, éd. Denoël

Comedian 
1909 : Beethoven by René Fauchois, directed by André Antoine at the Théâtre de l'Odéon

References 

20th-century French dramatists and playwrights
20th-century French male writers
20th-century French novelists
Writers from Paris
1870 births
1960 deaths